Ernst William Lundström (22 February 1880 – 17 July 1915) was a Finnish printer and politician. He was born in Helsinki, and was a member of the Parliament of Finland from 1908 until his death in 1915, representing the Social Democratic Party of Finland (SDP).

References

1880 births
1915 deaths
Politicians from Helsinki
People from Uusimaa Province (Grand Duchy of Finland)
Swedish-speaking Finns
Social Democratic Party of Finland politicians
Members of the Parliament of Finland (1908–09)
Members of the Parliament of Finland (1909–10)
Members of the Parliament of Finland (1910–11)
Members of the Parliament of Finland (1911–13)
Members of the Parliament of Finland (1913–16)